The 1957 Kentucky Wildcats football team were an American football team that represented the University of Kentucky as a member of the Southeastern Conference during the 1957 NCAA University Division football season. In their fourth season under head coach Blanton Collier, the team compiled a 3–7 record (1–7 in the SEC).

Schedule

References

Kentucky
Kentucky Wildcats football seasons
Kentucky Wildcats football